Dream Come True is the 6th studio album by Earl Klugh released in 1980. The album received a Grammy nomination for Best Jazz Fusion Performance at the 23rd Grammy Awards in 1981.

Track listing 
All tracks composed by Earl Klugh; except where indicated

Side One
"If It's in Your Heart (It's in Your Smile)" – 4:04
"Doc" – 4:44
"Amazon" – 4:02
"I Don't Want to Leave You Alone Anymore" (lyrics: Bill Allen, George Porter Martin) – 4:53

Side Two
"Spellbound" – 6:13
"Sweet Rum and Starlight" – 4:02
"Dream Come True" – 3:34
"Message to Michael" (Burt Bacharach, Hal David) – 5:54

Personnel
 Earl Klugh, Reggie Young, Perry Hughes, Greg Phillinganes – guitars
 Lloyd Green – pedal steel guitar
 Mickie Roquemore – keyboards, clavinet
 Greg Phillinganes – keyboards
 Daryl Dybuka – electric piano
 David Briggs – piano
 Hubie Crawford, Mike Leech, Marcus Miller – bass
 Gene Dunlap – drums
 Leonard "Doc" Gibbs – percussion

Charts

References 

1980 albums
Albums arranged by David Matthews (keyboardist)
Earl Klugh albums
Albums recorded at Electric Lady Studios